Blackwells Corner is an unincorporated community in Kern County, California. Blackwells Corner is at the intersection of California State Route 46 and California State Route 33, and was the last place James Dean was seen alive prior to his death in a car wreck.

The name honors George Blackwell, who started a rest stop there in 1921.

Climate
According to the Köppen Climate Classification system, Blackwells Corner has an arid climate, abbreviated "BWk" on climate maps.

References

Unincorporated communities in Kern County, California
Unincorporated communities in California